A prompter may refer to:

 Prompter (opera), a hidden person who tells a singer the first words of each phrase to be sung
 Prompter (theatre), a person hidden from the audience who reminds actors of their lines if they are forgotten 
 Teleprompter, a display device that prompts the person speaking with an electronic visual text of a speech or script